Tujunga is a monotypic genus of picture-winged fly in the family Ulidiidae. Tujunga mackenziei is the sole species in the genus.

References

Otitinae
Taxa named by George C. Steyskal
Insects described in 1961